Greatful is the fourth major release studio album by Canadian rapper Classified released on January 15, 2016 on Halflife Records, distributed by Universal Music Canada, and serves as his fifteenth album overall. The first single released, "No Pressure" featuring Snoop Dogg, peaked at number 65 on the Canadian Hot 100. The second single "Filthy" features DJ Premier. The third single "Noah's Arc" features Saukrates. The album debuted at number 6 on the Canadian Albums Chart.

Background 
According to Classified, he spent a long time working on the album and describes it as his magnum opus and most authentic project to date. He says "This album feels like what I've been working towards my whole career.......It took me longer than any other album, it's more personal and I got to work with my heroes in hip-hop. I'm excited to get this out to the fans who have listening to me since day one and the newer listeners who just started listening." In October 2015, he announced he will be going on tour across Canada in support of the album.

Track listing

Charts

References 

2016 albums
Classified (rapper) albums